Knut Kjartan Tørum (born 16 August 1971 in Bergen) is a Norwegian football coach. He's a former manager for Moss FK, leading the team to the Tippeliga play-off's in 2005. He's also a former assistant coach for Stabæk Fotball.

In August 2006, Tørum (at the time the club's assistant coach) took over as substitute head-coach for Rosenborg after Per Mathias Høgmo took a two-month sick leave. His take-over was very successful starting with eight league wins in a row (a club record) and earned Tørum the title coach of the month for August and October 2006. Rosenborg stated that Høgmo would return to his job as the club's head coach after the season, despite Tørums success. Tørum led Rosenborg in the last rounds of the league, and secured Rosenborg the gold medals. On 31 October, Per Matias Høgmo decided to retire as football-coach and quit his job in Rosenborg, and Tørum was offered the job as new head-coach in Rosenborg BK which he took. Tørum was awarded coach of the year for 2006.

He was not able to gain the same success in the 2007 domestic season, but Rosenborg managed to qualify for the UEFA Champions League where the club impressed in the group stage with a 1-1 draw away against Chelsea FC and beating Valencia CF 2-0 twice. He resigned the day after the latter match against Valencia.

Tørum was appointed as head-coach of IK Start in December 2008. He resigned this position 22 June 2011, hours before a cup match against Strømsgodset IF. After leaving his job at Start, Tørum and his family wanted to stay in Kristiansand, and in December 2011 he got a non-football job in Kristiansand. In January 2013, he was appointed as Tor Ole Skullerud's assistant coach of the Norwegian under-21 team.

He has his education from the Norwegian School of Sport Sciences.

Honours
Norway
Tippeligaen: 2006

Individual
Tippeligaen Coach of the Month: August 2006, October 2006
Kniksen Award Coach of the Year: 2006

References

1971 births
Living people
Norwegian football managers
Kniksen Award winners
Rosenborg BK managers
Norwegian School of Sport Sciences alumni
Sportspeople from Bergen
IK Start managers
Moss FK managers
Norwegian footballers
Association football midfielders
Arendal Fotball managers